Sir Robert Scholey   (8 October 1921 – 12 January 2014) was the Chairman of British Steel from 1986 to 1992.

Early life 

Scholey was born in Sheffield and was educated at King Edward VII School, Sheffield. He left school aged 16 to work for Steel, Peech and Tozer, studying engineering four nights a week at Sheffield University.  During World War II he served as a captain in the Royal Electrical and Mechanical Engineers.

Career
In 1947 he moved to work at United Steel Companies and after nationalisation moved again to work at British Steel Corporation's head office, becoming CEO in 1973 and chairman in 1986. He retired from British Steel in 1992.

He was also on the board of Eurotunnel from 1987-1994, and chairman of the International Iron and Steel Institute for 1989-90. He also served terms as president of Eurofer, the European steel association, and in 1989 the Institute of Metals.

He died in 2014 at Much Hadham, Hertfordshire. He was married with two daughters.

Honours and awards
Made Commander of the British Empire (CBE) in the 1982 New Year Honours and knighted in the 1987 Birthday Honours.
Awarded the Bessemer Gold Medal of the Institute of Metals in 1988.
Elected a Fellow of the Royal Academy of Engineering in 1990.

References 

1921 births
2014 deaths
People educated at King Edward VII School, Sheffield
English industrialists
Knights Bachelor
Commanders of the Order of the British Empire
Fellows of the Royal Academy of Engineering
Royal Electrical and Mechanical Engineers officers
British Army personnel of World War II
Engineers from Yorkshire
Bessemer Gold Medal
20th-century English businesspeople